Taoyuan station may refer to:

 Taoyuan railway station, a railway station in Taoyuan, Taiwan
 Taoyuan station (Shenzhen Metro), a station on the Shenzhen Metro in Shenzhen, Guangdong Province, China
 Taoyuan station (Nanchang Metro), a station on Line 4 of the Nanchang Metro in Nanchang, Jiangxi Province, China
 Taoyuan station (Dalian Metro), a station on Line 5 of the Dalian Metro in Dalian, Liaoning Province, China